Mladen Čučić (born 8 September 1983) is a Croatian retired football goalkeeper.

References

1983 births
Living people
Association football goalkeepers
Croatian footballers
NK Istra 1961 players
FC Koper players
NK Grafičar Vodovod players
PAS Lamia 1964 players
NK Kamen Ingrad players
HNK Segesta players
Khatoco Khánh Hòa FC players
Foolad Yazd players
NK Crikvenica players
HNK Orijent players
NK Vinogradar players
First Football League (Croatia) players
Croatian expatriate footballers
Expatriate footballers in Slovenia
Croatian expatriate sportspeople in Slovenia
Expatriate footballers in Greece
Croatian expatriate sportspeople in Greece
Expatriate footballers in Vietnam
Croatian expatriate sportspeople in Vietnam
Expatriate footballers in Iran
Croatian expatriate sportspeople in Iran